Edward Welsh may refer to:

Edward Welsh (soldier), Union Army soldier and Medal of Honor recipient
Edward C. Welsh, American official

See also
Edward Welch (disambiguation)